Alon Lubezky (born 25 August 1980) is an Israeli retired footballer who played for the Charleston Battery.

References

External links
 Player profile at Charleston Battery
 Player profile at University of Hartford
 Player profile at PlayerHistory.com

1980 births
Living people
Israeli footballers
Hartford Hawks men's soccer players
Charleston Battery players
USL First Division players
People from Tel Aviv District
Association football forwards